This is a list of rank insignia used by the Islamic Revolutionary Guard Corps (IRGC) in Iran.

Rank insignia chart
Officers

Enlisted

See also

References

.
Army of the Guardians of the Islamic Revolution
Iran